Hapoel Holon Basketball Club, known for sponsorship reasons as Hapoel Atsmon Playgrounds Holon, is a professional basketball club based in Holon, Israel. The team plays in the Israeli Basketball Premier League (the top tier of Israeli basketball), and internationally in the Basketball Champions League. The team was founded in 1947, and plays in the Holon Toto Hall, which is home to 5,500 spectators.

One of Hapoel Holon's most notable title victories came in 2008, as the club pulled one of the biggest upsets in league history by defeating perennial champions Maccabi Tel Aviv in the Premier League final. The club also went on to win the Israeli Basketball State Cup in 2009, defeating Maccabi Haifa, and also in 2018, defeating Maccabi Tel Aviv. Hapoel Holon won its first-ever international title in 2021 in the form of the Balkan International Basketball League, defeating Bulgarian side Academic Plovdiv.

History
Hapoel Holon was founded in 1947. It was one of the founding clubs of the top division in 1954, finishing second in their first season.

Hapoel Holon returned to the top division at the end of the 2006–07 season, after playing for 7 years in the second and third divisions. They finished the 2007–08 regular season at the top of the table. They reached the playoff final, where they defeated Maccabi Tel Aviv 73–72 to claim their first championship, with Malik Dixon scoring the winning shot two seconds prior to the end of the game. Former and future NBA player P. J. Tucker won the MVP title. It was the first time Maccabi Tel Aviv had failed to win the championship in 14 years.

The club has reached the final of the Israeli Basketball State Cup six times, but did not pick up their first prize in that competition until 2009, when Brian Tolbert hit a three-pointer as time expired to give them a 69–68 win over Maccabi Haifa in that year's final.

On January 16, 2010, Hapoel Holon celebrated its 1,000th game in the Ligat HaAl. 

In 2018, Hapoel Holon won its second State Cup after beating Maccabi Tel Aviv in the Final, behind MVP and former NBA player Glen Rice Jr.

Arena

Between the years 1953–2015, Hapoel Holon played its home games in the May 1 hall in Holon, Also known as the "tin hall" due to its being made of tin-like irons. It was inaugurated on the 5th Independence Day of the State of Israel, in 1953, in a game against Hapoel Tel Aviv, in which Hapoel Holon won 41:38.  The hall was the first in the country to have lighting installed that made it possible to play in the dark. 

Due to its low capacity of 2,800 seats, the tin hall was deemed unfit for hosting Israeli basketball premiere league games. 

In 2012, A construction began of a new Hall in Park Peres - the Holon Toto Hall, named after Ofer Eshed, an iconic Hapoel Holon player in the past. 

Since its completion in 2015, Hapoel Holon plays its home games at in the 5,500 seat Holon Toto Hall.

Honors

Total titles: 5

Domestic
Israeli Championships
Winners (2): 2008, 2022
Runners-up (3): 1954, 1955, 2018
semi-finals (9): 1983, 1985, 1986, 1988, 1995, 1999, 2008, 2012, 2018
State Cup
Winners (2): 2009, 2018
Runners-up (5): 1959, 1961, 1986, 1991, 1995
League Cup
Runner-up (2): 2011, 2020

European 
Basketball Champions League
Semifinalist (1): 2021–22
Final 8 (1): 2020–21
FIBA Europe Cup
Semifinalist (1): 2018–19

Regional competitions
Balkan League
Winners (1): 2020–21

Season by season

Players

Current roster

Notable players

Holon's best homegrown player was Ofer Eshed who played for the club between 1957 and 1972. He is the all-time points leader in the team, with 7,495 points.

Israel Elimelech (nicknamed – The King) is considered to be the club's biggest symbol. He played in Holon during two decades, and led the team to many successful seasons in the Premier League. He played on the legendary home-grown team of Holon in the 1980s, with Niv Boogin (Doctor Boogin), Motti Daniel, Avi Maor, and the Israeli-American player Mike Carter (The Crazy – Meshugah), who was known for driving the fans crazy. Other notable players were: Tzahi Peled, Danny Hadar, Rami Zeig, and from very early days and the contingent of ex Egyptian players: Marcel Hefetz.

The team's 2 titles were won by 2 winning baskets, scored by the 2007–08 PG Malik Dixon, and 2008–09 SG Brian Tolbert. Dixon scored a two-pointer 2 seconds before the end of the championship match against Maccabi Tel-Aviv, leaving Maccabi a 2-second possession which they failed to score in. Tolbert scored a three-point buzzer-beater in the cup final, after he got the ball from an inbound pass by Deron Washington.

Over the years the club has signed several former NBA players, including P. J. Tucker, Ken Bannister, Clarence Kea, Cliff Pondexter, Albert King, Richard Dumas, and Dominic McGuire. John Thomas, who played in the 2009–10 season, is also a former NBA player, with a history in five teams, including the New Jersey Nets and  Atlanta Hawks.

 
 Ofer Eshed 13 seasons: '57–'72
 Rami Zeig-Barak 13 seasons: '57–'72
 Moti Daniel 9 seasons: '78–'85, '99–'01
 Niv Boogin 14 seasons: '78–'91, '95–'96
 Israel Elimelech 16 seasons: '78–'92, '95–'97
 Ofer Fleischer 4 seasons: '82–'83, '99–'02
 Mike Carter 5 seasons: '82–'84, '92–'95
 Clarence Kea 1 season: '84–'85
 Desi Barmore 6 seasons: '84–'90
 Ken Bannister 1 season: '86–'87
 Joe Dawson 2 seasons: '87–'88, '01–'02
 Earl Williams 2 seasons: '88–'89, '90–'91
 Ben McDonald 1 season: '88–'89
 Richard Dumas 1 season: '90–'91
 Kobi Baloul 6 seasons: '90–'94, '99–'01
 David Henderson 2 seasons: '92–'94
 Richard Rellford 1 season: '93–'94
 David Thirdkill 1 season: '94–'95
 Shelton Jones 2 seasons: '94–'95, '96
 Yoav Saffar 4 seasons: '94–'98
 Milt Wagner 1 season: '95–'96
 Derrick Hamilton 1 season: '95–'96
 Joe Wylie 2 seasons: '97–'98, '00–'01
 Greg Sutton 1 season: '98–'99
 Moshe Mizrahi 3 seasons: '98–'01
 Corey Crowder 1 season: '99–'00
 Dušan Bocevski 1 season: '99–'00
 P. J. Tucker 1 season: '07–'08
 Malik Dixon 1 season: '07–'08
 Tre Simmons 1 season: '07–'08
 Eric Campbell 1 season: '07–'08
 Chris Watson 2 seasons: '07–'09
 Moran Roth 3 seasons: '07–'08, '10–'12
 Guni Israeli 5 seasons: '07–'08, '13–'17
 Elton Brown 1 season: '08
 Luis Flores 1 season: '08–'09
 Deron Washington 1 season: '08–'09
 Dwayne Mitchell 1 season: '09–'10
 John Thomas 1 season: '09–'10
 Saša Bratić 1 season: '10
 Richard Melzer 1 season: '10–'11
 Jamie Arnold 1 season: '10–'11
 Bryant Dunston 1 season: '11–'12
 Ron Lewis 1 season: '11–'12
 Shlomi Harush 8 seasons: '11–'15, '16–present
 Dominic Waters 1 season: '12–'13
 Jerome Dyson 1 season: '12–'13
 Frank Hassell 1 season: '12–'13
 Laurence Bowers 1 season: '13–'14
 Scottie Reynolds 3 seasons: '13–'14, '16, '19
 Isaac Rosefelt 3 seasons: '13–'16
 Dominic McGuire 1 season: '14–'15
 Tony Crocker 1 season: '14–'15
 Jordan Taylor 2 seasons: '14–'15, '16–'17
 Will Clyburn 1 season: '15–'16
 James Bell 1 season: '16–'17
 Darion Atkins 2 seasons: '16–'17, '18–'19
 Khalif Wyatt 2 seasons: '16–'17, '18–'19
 Tu Holloway 1.5 seasons: '16–'18
 Glen Rice Jr. 1 season: '17–'18
 TaShawn Thomas 1 season: '17–'18
 Tamir Blatt 1 season: '17–'18
 Joe Alexander 2 seasons: '17–'18, '19–present
 Corey Walden 2 seasons: '17–'19
 DeQuan Jones 1 season: '18–'19

 Ofer Yaakobi 
 Chaim Zlotikman

Colors and mascot
The team's colors are yellow and purple after a Jewish American fan of the Los Angeles Lakers donated uniforms in the colors of his favorite club. Before that, the team played in red and white uniforms, like almost every 'Hapoel' team.

For many years Holon's mascot was a tiger. It appeared on the team's logo for many years and in the 1990s the team's logo read 'Hapoel Tigers Holon'. After the team won the 2007–08 National League championship, and upgraded to the first division, the old symbol was changed and redesigned, keeping Holon's symbol, the tiger.

References

External links
Official website 
Holoniafans – The Official fansite 
Fansite – The Kometz From Gate 3  

Holon
Basketball teams established in 1947
Holon
Israeli Basketball Premier League teams
Sport in Holon